This list of dental schools in the U.S. includes major academic institutions in the U.S. that award advanced professional degrees of either D.D.S. or D.M.D. in the field of dentistry. It does not include schools of medicine, and it includes 66 schools of dentistry in 36 states, the District of Columbia, and Puerto Rico. It also includes several schools of osteopathic medicine which award DDS/DMD degrees in addition to a DO medical degree.

Alabama

UAB School of Dentistry, Birmingham

Arizona

A.T. Still University, the Arizona School of Dentistry and Oral Health, Mesa
Midwestern University College of Dental Medicine-Arizona, Glendale

California

Loma Linda University School of Dentistry, Loma Linda
University of California, Los Angeles School of Dentistry, Los Angeles
University of California, San Francisco School of Dentistry, San Francisco
University of the Pacific Arthur A. Dugoni School of Dentistry, San Francisco
The Herman Ostrow School of Dentistry of USC, Los Angeles
Western University of Health Sciences College of Dental Medicine, Pomona

Colorado

University of Colorado School of Dental Medicine, Aurora

Connecticut
 University of Connecticut School of Dental Medicine, Farmington

District of Columbia 

Howard University College of Dentistry, Washington

Florida

Lake Erie College of Osteopathic Medicine, School of Dental Medicine, Bradenton
Nova Southeastern University College of Dental Medicine, Ft. Lauderdale
University of Florida College of Dentistry, Gainesville

Georgia

The Dental College of Georgia at Augusta University, Augusta

Illinois

Midwestern University College of Dental Medicine, Downers Grove
University of Illinois at Chicago College of Dentistry, Chicago
Southern Illinois University School of Dental Medicine, Alton

Indiana

Indiana University School of Dentistry, Indianapolis

Iowa

University of Iowa College of Dentistry, Iowa City

Kentucky

University of Kentucky College of Dentistry, Lexington
University of Louisville School of Dentistry, Louisville

Louisiana

Louisiana State University School of Dentistry, New Orleans

Maine

University of New England College of Dental Medicine, Portland

Maryland

University of Maryland School of Dentistry (Baltimore), founded as the Baltimore College of Dental Surgery, Baltimore

Massachusetts

Boston University Henry M. Goldman School of Dental Medicine, Boston
Harvard School of Dental Medicine, Boston
Tufts University School of Dental Medicine, Boston

Michigan

University of Michigan School of Dentistry, Ann Arbor
The University of Detroit Mercy School of Dentistry, Detroit

Minnesota

University of Minnesota School of Dentistry, Minneapolis

Mississippi

University of Mississippi Medical Center School of Dentistry, Jackson

Missouri

University of Missouri–Kansas City School of Dentistry, Kansas City
Missouri School of Dentistry & Oral Health at A.T. Still University, Kirksville
Kansas City University College of Dental Medicine, Joplin

Nebraska

University of Nebraska Medical Center College of Dentistry, Lincoln
Creighton University School of Dentistry, Omaha

Nevada

University of Nevada at Las Vegas School of Dental Medicine, Las Vegas

New Jersey

Rutgers School of Dental Medicine, Newark (formerly University of Medicine and Dentistry of New Jersey - UMDNJ)

New York

Columbia University College of Dental Medicine, New York City
New York University College of Dentistry, New York City
University at Buffalo School of Dental Medicine, Buffalo
State University of New York at Stony Brook School of Dental Medicine, Stony Brook
Touro College of Dental Medicine, Valhalla

North Carolina

UNC Adams School of Dentistry, Chapel Hill
East Carolina University School of Dental Medicine, Greenville

Ohio

Case School of Dental Medicine, Cleveland
The Ohio State University College of Dentistry, Columbus

Oklahoma

University of Oklahoma College of Dentistry, Oklahoma City

Oregon

Oregon Health & Science University School of Dentistry, Portland

Pennsylvania

Lake Erie College of Osteopathic Medicine, Erie
Temple University, Maurice H. Kornberg School of Dentistry, Philadelphia
University of Pennsylvania School of Dental Medicine, Philadelphia
University of Pittsburgh School of Dental Medicine, Pittsburgh

Puerto Rico

University of Puerto Rico School of Dental Medicine, San Juan

South Carolina

Medical University of South Carolina College of Dental Medicine, Charleston

Tennessee
Meharry Medical College School of Dentistry, Nashville
University of Tennessee Health Sciences Center College of Dentistry, Memphis

Texas

Texas A&M University College of Dentistry, Texas A&M Health Science Center, Dallas
Dental School at the University of Texas Health Science Center at San Antonio, San Antonio
University of Texas Health Science Center at Houston School of Dentistry, Houston
Woody L. Hunt School of Dental Medicine, Texas Tech University Health Sciences Center El Paso, El Paso (opens in 2021)

Utah

Roseman University of Health Sciences College of Dental Medicine, South Jordan
University of Utah, School of Dentistry, Salt Lake City

Virginia

Virginia Commonwealth University School of Dentistry, Richmond

Washington

University of Washington School of Dentistry, Seattle

West Virginia

West Virginia University School of Dentistry, Charleston and Morgantown (main campus)

Wisconsin

Marquette University School of Dentistry, Milwaukee

See also

American Dental Education Association
American Student Dental Association
List of colleges and universities in the United States
List of medical schools in the United States
List of dental organizations in the United States
List of defunct dental schools in the United States

References

External links
Complete List of all 65 Dental Schools in the United States Updated Sept. 4, 2014 American Student Dental Association 
Dental Schools in the United States Findmydentist.com
Complete List of all 61 Dental Schools in the USA Updated November 3rd 2010 PreDDS.NET

 
Lists of universities and colleges in the United States
United States
United States health-related lists